The Los Angeles Pop Festival was held at the Los Angeles Memorial Sports Arena in California. The dates of the festival were December 22 and 23, 1968. It was also called a "Christmas Happening". The groups playing at the festival included (in alphabetical order):

 Blue Cheer
 The Box Tops
 Canned Heat
 The Chambers Brothers
 José Feliciano
 The Grass Roots
 The Love Exchange
 Buddy Miles
 The Righteous Brothers
 Steve Miller Blues Band
 Three Dog Night
 The Turtles

See also
List of historic rock festivals
List of music festivals in the United States

References

External links
 The Grass Roots Official Site Event Posters

Rock festivals in the United States
Music festivals in Los Angeles
1968 in California
Music festivals established in 1968
1968 music festivals